The pharmaceutical industry in Canada employs approximately 30,000 people. It supplies about one third of the domestic pharmaceutical consumer market of $27 billion annually. This accounts for ~16% of yearly health expenditures. Canada had a pharmaceutical trade deficit of $8.5 billion in 2018 with exports of $11 billion and imports of $19.5 billion. The majority of large pharmaceutical companies are headquartered in Montreal, Quebec. Both Toronto and Montreal have healthy pharmaceutical industries.

History
The first pharmaceutical company in Canada was founded in 1879 by E. B. Shuttleworth. in 1887, the first foreign-owned subsidiary was started in Windsor by the American firm Parke, Davis and Company. This branch-plant operation was primarily set up to take advantage of Canadian tariff laws designed to protect domestic manufacturers from foreign competition.

Companies

Canada hosts several large public (Bausch Health) and private (Apotex) pharmaceutical companies as well as many subsidiaries (Buckley's) of larger international companies.

References

Industry in Canada